Magical Dirt is the fourth studio album by American psychedelic rock band Radio Moscow (or their fifth studio album, if the 2012 album 3 & 3 Quarters, which was a collection of demos recorded and produced in 2003 by frontman Parker Griggs before the formation of the band, is included).

Track listing

Personnel
Radio Moscow 
Parker Griggs – vocals, guitars, harmonica, production, mixing
Anthony Meier – bass
Paul Marrone - drums, percussion
Additional personnel
Matt VanAllen – engineering, mixing

References

External links 
 Album website
 iTunes preview
 Exclusive stream of the whole album by Classic Rock

2014 albums
Radio Moscow (band) albums
Alive Naturalsound Records albums